MADAM-6, or 2,N-dimethyl-4,5-methylenedioxyamphetamine, is a lesser-known recreational drug of the methamphetamine class, similar in structure to MDMA (ecstasy). MADAM-6 was first synthesized by Alexander Shulgin. In Shulgin's book PiHKAL, the minimum dosage is listed as greater than 280 mg, and the duration is unknown. MADAM-6 produces few to no effects and Shulgin describes it as "not active". Very little data exists about the pharmacological properties, metabolism, and toxicity of MADAM-6.

MADAM-6 has been studied for its potential antiparkinsonian effects. However, there are no clinical trials suggesting the drug is effective against Parkinson's disease.

See also 
 Phenethylamine
 Psychedelics, dissociatives and deliriants

References

Methamphetamines
Benzodioxoles